A bullwhip is a single-tailed whip, usually made of leather and originally used with livestock.

Bullwhip may also refer to:

 Bullwhip effect, an observed phenomenon in forecast-driven distribution channels
 Bullwhip (film), a 1958 film starring Rhonda Fleming
"Bullwhip",  a song by Geronimo Black from their self-titled album